The Foundling's War is a 1977 novel by the French writer Michel Déon. Its French title is les Vingt ans du jeune homme vert, which means "the twenty years of the green young man". It is set in occupied Paris during World War II and follows a young man who grew up as an adoptive child and navigates through the social turmoil around him.

The book is the sequel to The Foundling Boy from 1975, which is set during the interwar period. The Foundling's War was published by éditions Gallimard in 1977. An English translation by Julian Evans was published in 2014 through Gallic Books.

Reception
Nancy Kline of The New York Times reviewed the book in 2015, and described it as "a sprawling 19th-century-style novel". Kline questioned the author's sense of humour from a political standpoint, and wrote that "[Déon's] jokes call his politics into question. ... [J]okes about homosexuals and Jewish noses, especially in the context of the 1940s, are at best in questionable taste. Déon’s prolix, cynical novel, ably translated, may amuse some readers. Others, not."

References

External links
 The Foundling's War at the French publisher's website 
 The Foundling's War at the British publisher's website

1977 French novels
Éditions Gallimard books
French-language novels
Novels by Michel Déon
Novels set in Paris
Sequel novels
Novels set during World War II